The Feat. Best is the third greatest hits album by Japanese-American singer-songwriter Ai. It was released on November 2, 2016, by EMI Records. The album features 35 artists, including Japanese singers Namie Amuro, Thelma Aoyama, Miliyah Kato, Hikaru Utada, and Exile Atsushi. American artists such as Chaka Khan, Snoop Dogg, The Jacksons, Jeremih, and Boyz II Men also appear on the album.

Upon its release, the album peaked at number 33 on the Billboard Japan Hot Albums chart and number 28 on the Oricon Albums Chart. In support of the album, Ai embarked on The Best Tour, performing at various venues and locations in Japan.

Background and release 
Earlier in 2016, a deluxe version of Ai's 2015 greatest hits album The Best was reissued, which included the sleeper hit promotional single "Minna ga Minna ga Eiyū". In September 2016, Universal Japan announced Ai would be embarking on an anniversary tour, The Best Tour. Later that month, The Feat. Best was announced to be released alongside a triple a-side single, "Happy Christmas/Heiwa/Miracle". "Heiwa" was pre-released to digital stores as a promotional single to promote the release. Both the maxi single and greatest hits album were revealed to be released on November 2, 2016, which was the date of Ai's 35th birthday.

Track listing

Charts

Release history

References 

2016 greatest hits albums
Ai (singer) compilation albums
EMI Records compilation albums
Universal Music Group compilation albums
Universal Music Japan compilation albums
Albums produced by Ai (singer)